The Eight Immortals Restaurant murders, also known as the Eight Immortals murders or the Chinese Pork Bun murders, were an incident in which Chinese gambler Huang Zhiheng murdered a family of 10 in the Eight Immortals Restaurant. Huang purportedly committed these murders due to a gambling dispute.

Background

Eight Immortals Restaurant 
The Eight Immortals Restaurant was a Chinese restaurant in the Portuguese colony of Macau, in the Iao Hon section of Nossa Senhora de Fátima parish. The modest eating establishment was connected to the Eight Immortals Hotel. The restaurant was owned and operated by Zheng Lin (鄭林), a former street hawker who moved his business from a stand into a formal restaurant in the 1960s. He lived near his restaurant with his family, who helped him run his business. The restaurant was a financial success, but Zheng and his wife were noted to be heavy gamblers.

Huang Zhiheng 
Huang Zhiheng (sometimes spelled Huang Chih-heng) was born on the Chinese mainland  as Chen Shuliang before emigrating to Hong Kong in the 1970s. He went by various names during his life, going by Chen Shuliang or Chen Yuliang when in Hong Kong. In 1973, Huang murdered a man over a debt at his victim's home in Quarry Bay, Hong Kong and fled Hong Kong for Guangzhou. While in Guangzhou, Huang cut off the tip of his left index finger and burned his fingerprints in an attempt to avoid being linked to the murder. After living in Guangzhou for several years, Huang married the daughter of his landlord, named Ms. Li. The woman's family disapproved of the marriage, so the couple eloped, fleeing to Macau. In Macau, Huang became involved in the local gambling scene, becoming acquainted with the Zhengs in the process. Huang was around 50 years old at the time.

During one evening of gambling in 1984, Huang and Zheng Lin became involved in a series of high stakes bets against each other. In the end Huang won 180,000 patacas (or US$20,000) from Zheng and his wife. The Zhengs were unable to pay the debt, so a verbal agreement was made that the Zheng family would cede their restaurant's mortgage to Huang if the debt was not repaid within one year. Huang agreed. The family remained indebted to Huang after this year. Huang would later claim that not only had the family failed to repay him, but continued to lose money to him. He claimed they owed him, in total, 600,000 patacas (or $75,047).

Events

Murders 
The Eight Immortals murders took place on the night of 4 August 1985. Nine members of the Zheng family were busy inside the restaurant, having closed the establishment earlier that evening. The Zhengs were last seen alive by a delivery truck driver late in the afternoon. In the evening, Huang entered the Eight Immortals Restaurant and demanded that the Zhengs pay him 30,000 patacas (he later claimed that he dropped his demand to 20,000 patacas) of the debt they owed him. He grew increasingly agitated when Zheng Lin refused to turn over ownership of the restaurant. Eventually, Huang became physically aggressive towards the Zhengs, using a broken bottle that remained as a weapon. He took Zheng Lin's son hostage and forced the other members of the family to bind and gag each other while holding his weapon to the son's neck. Huang reports that one family member broke free and started to scream, causing him to stab her in the neck with his weapon. He then proceeded to kill all nine people, either by strangulation or with the broken bottle. He then briefly left the restaurant to lure one of Zheng's sisters to the restaurant, where he then killed her. He dismembered the bodies over the course of eight hours and wrapped them in black plastic trash bags, which he then dumped into the ocean or threw into dumpsters. Afterwards, he cleaned the restaurant, recovered some money and a safe key from Zheng Lin's corpse, and left the restaurant, spending the night at Zheng's nearby residence.

The next morning a delivery truck driver (the same one who had delivered goods to the Zheng family the previous afternoon) found the restaurant locked with a note on the door stating that the restaurant was closed for three days. He visited the Zheng family home, where Huang answered the door, telling the delivery man that the Zheng family had left on a trip to the mainland. On 8 August 1985, a swimmer found eight pieces of human limbs in Hac Sa Beach (黑沙海灘, also called as Black-sand Beach). It was originally theorised that a group of illegal immigrants from Mainland China had their refugee boat capsized, and were eaten by sharks, but an examination of the limbs revealed that precise cuts had been used to sever them. This finding prompted a police investigation and a search for potential missing people. Over the next few days, forensics determined that the limbs belonged to at least four separate people. A further three body parts were found on Macau's beaches over the following week. These findings generated significant interest in the press, and several theories were raised as to what had happened.

Eventually, the Macau police were able to discover that the severed limbs belonged to the Zheng family, who were reported missing by relatives. In the meantime, Huang had reopened and continued to operate the Eight Immortals Restaurant; this was considered unusual but not unwarranted as he was known to associate with the Zheng family and was in possession of the restaurant's ownership documents. He also began collecting rent from the Zheng family's former home. However, Macau police grew suspicious of Huang's activities and began investigating him. When they searched his bank holdings, they found documents belonging to Zheng Lin and student ID cards belonging to the missing Zheng children. Huang attempted to flee Macau for the Chinese mainland, but he was caught and arrested on 28 September 1986. He was charged with the murder of all ten members of the Zheng family, and was convicted on 2 October 1986. Huang's arrest and the press documentation that he had been operating a restaurant for months after dismembering the eatery's former owners, as well as reopening the restaurant three days after committing the crime resulted in the urban legend that he had baked his victims into pork buns. The last body parts traceable to the Eight Immortals murders were found in a trash dump in 1989.

Victims 
Zheng Lin, over 50 years old, owner of the restaurant
Chen Huiyi, 42, wife of Zheng
Natalia Zheng Baoqiong, 18, eldest daughter of Zheng
Stefani Zheng Baohong, 12, second daughter of Zheng
Zoey Zheng Baowen, 10, third daughter of Zheng
Joanna Zheng Baohua, 9, fourth daughter of Zheng
Antonio Zheng Guande, 7, only son of Zheng
Chen Lirong, 70, mother of Chen
Chen Zhen (also known as Chen Lizhen), 60, ninth aunt of Chen
Zheng Boliang, 61, chef and Zheng Lin's older cousin

Aftermath 
Huang was attacked in prison by another inmate the day after his conviction. He was sent to a hospital to convalesce, where he attempted to escape without success. On 6 October, he confessed and detailed to investigators how he had killed the Zheng family. He attempted suicide twice, the second time fatally, on 4 December 1986 by slicing his wrists with a bottle cap. He left a suicide note and a letter to a local newspaper explaining his actions, stating in his note that his suicide was not due to his crimes but rather to escape his chronic asthma.  After his death, what was left of his fingerprints linked him to the 1973 murder of a Hong Kong man.

The recovered remains of the Zheng family were later cremated, and the ashes scattered off the coast of Macau by relatives.

After Huang's arrest, the restaurant was immediately closed and seized by the Macau police. It was resold by early 1987 and has seen different owners in recent years. Today, the former restaurant and the apartments above it are part of Baxian Hotel.

Media coverage 
The events surrounding the Eight Immortals murders were depicted in the 1993 Hong Kong movie The Untold Story featuring Anthony Wong. The film featured a fictionalized version of the murder of the Zheng family, and notably played upon the rumors that cannibalism had occurred after the murders. In China, the film was also released under the names The Human Pork Bun and Human Meat Roast Pork Buns.

Notes

References 

1985 murders in Asia
Family murders
Mass murder in 1985
People murdered in Macau
1985 in Macau
Portuguese Macau
Mass stabbings in China